Cirsonella carinata, common name the ridged false-top-shell, is a species of minute sea snail, a marine gastropod mollusk in the family Skeneidae.

Description
The height of the shell attains 1.7 mm, its diameter 1.8 mm. The minute, smooth and glossy, cream-colored shell has a turbinate shape. The four whorls have an impressed suture. The body whorl is bluntly keeled at the periphery. There is a sculpture of dense spiral microscopic striae. The base of the shell is rounded. The umbilicus is narrow and deep, and it is surrounded by a callus funicle which expands anteriorly to join the simple lip in an angular lobe. The aperture is subcircular.

Distribution
This marine species occurs off New South Wales, South Australia, Tasmania, Victoria, Australia, at depths between 73 m and 200 m.

References

 Cotton, B.C. 1959. South Australian Mollusca. Archaeogastropoda. Handbook of the Flora and Fauna of South Australia. Adelaide : South Australian Government Printer 449 pp
 Iredale, T. & McMichael, D.F. 1962. A reference list of the marine Mollusca of New South Wales. Memoirs of the Australian Museum 11: 1–109

External links
 

carinata
Gastropods described in 1903